Senator Gorham may refer to:

Benjamin Gorham (1775–1855), Massachusetts State Senate
Charles T. Gorham (1812–1901), Michigan State Senate

See also
Senator Gorman (disambiguation)